Edgard Salvé (born 1 August 1946) is a retired Belgian middle-distance runner who specialized in the 1500 metres.

He was born in Bensberg, Germany, but represented the sports club RFC Liège. His greatest achievement was winning the 1969 European Indoor Games. He finished fifth at the 1967 European Indoor Games, fourth at the 1969 European Championships. and seventh at the 1970 European Indoor Championships, and also competed at the 1968 and 1972 Olympic Games without reaching the final.

His personal best time was 3:39.91 minutes (1969). In the 3000 metres he finished seventh at the 1975 European Indoor Championships.

References

1946 births
Living people
Belgian male middle-distance runners
Belgian male long-distance runners
Athletes (track and field) at the 1968 Summer Olympics
Athletes (track and field) at the 1972 Summer Olympics
Olympic athletes of Belgium